This is the list of the Formula SAE winners by Formula:

United States

Formula SAE Michigan
	1981	 Stevens Institute of Technology
	1982	 University of Texas at Austin
	1983	 University of Texas at Arlington
	1984	 University of Houston
	1985	 University of Texas at Arlington
	1986	 University of Texas at Arlington
	1987	 University of Maryland - College Park
	1988	 Cornell University
	1989	 University of Texas at Arlington
	1990	 University of Texas at Arlington
	1991	 Virginia Polytechnic Institute and State University
	1992	 Cornell University
	1993	 Cornell University
	1994	 University of Michigan at Ann Arbor
	1995	 University of Texas at Arlington
	1996	 University of Texas at Arlington
	1997	 Cornell University
	1998	 Cornell University
	1999	 University of Akron
	2000	 Texas A&M University
	2001	 Cornell University
	2002	 Cornell University
	2003	 University of Wollongong
	2004	 Cornell University
	2005	 Cornell University
	2006	 RMIT University
	2007	 University of Wisconsin–Madison
	2008	 University of Western Australia
	2009	 Graz University of Technology
	2010	/ Global Formula Racing
	2011	/ Global Formula Racing
	2012	/ Global Formula Racing
	2013	 University of Stuttgart
	2014	/ Global Formula Racing
	2015	/ Global Formula Racing
	2016	 University of Stuttgart
	2017	 University of Stuttgart
	2018	 University of Stuttgart
	2019	 University of Stuttgart
	2021	 University of Michigan at Ann Arbor
   2022	 University of Illinois Urbana-Champaign Combustion / Polytechnique Montreal Electric

Formula SAE Lincoln

United Kingdom

Formula Student

Italy

Formula SAE Italy

Japan

Formula SAE Japan

Canada

Formula North

Austria

Formula Student Austria

Czech

Formula Student Czech

Croatia

Formula Student Alpe Adria

Altre 

(c) - combustion

(e) - electric

(h) - hybrid

References 
From 2006 to 2011 Formula SAE West was held at Auto Club Speedway in Fontana, CA.

External links
Formula Student World Rankings

Formula SAE